The 1st Combat Aviation Brigade is a military formation of the Republic of Korea Army. The brigade is subordinated to the Army Aviation Operations Command (Republic of Korea).

History 
It was founded on June 1, 1978 with the 202nd and 203rd aviation battalions, operating UH-1H, were established at the 61st Aviation Group.

In order to suppress the Gwangju Uprising in 1980, in accordance with the “Helicopter Operation Plan” of the Army Headquarters, Brigadier General Song Jin-won of the 1st Aviation Brigade, ordered the unit to  deployed to Gwangju city on 22 May.

Organization 

Headquarters
 111th Aviation Group (75 AH-1F/S)
It is a joint unit of the 6th Marine Brigade stationed on Baengnyeongdo Island.
 502nd Aviation Battalion (50 MD 500)
 901st Aviation Battalion (18 AH-64E)
 902nd Aviation Battalion (18 AH-64E)

References 

Republic of Korea Army
Military units and formations established in 1978
Hanam
Gwangju Uprising